Todor Petrović (born 18 August 1994) is a Bosnian footballer who plays as a midfielder for club Cong An Nhan Dan FC.

Club career

Voždovac
Petrović signed for Voždovac in 2014, but left the club at the end of 2018, where his contract expired.

Vorskla Poltava
On 22 January 2019, Petrović signed for Ukrainian Premier League club Vorskla Poltava.

Inter Zaprešić
On 2 March 2020, Petrović joined Croatian club Inter Zaprešić.

References

External links
 
 Todor Petrović stats at utakmica.rs 
 

1994 births
Living people
People from Glamoč
Serbs of Bosnia and Herzegovina
Association football midfielders
Bosnia and Herzegovina footballers
Serbian footballers
FK Zemun players
FK Sopot players
Xerez CD footballers
FK Voždovac players
FC Vorskla Poltava players
NK Inter Zaprešić players
FK Radnički Niš players
Serbian SuperLiga players
Tercera División players
Ukrainian Premier League players
Croatian Football League players
Bosnia and Herzegovina expatriate footballers
Expatriate footballers in Serbia
Bosnia and Herzegovina expatriate sportspeople in Serbia
Expatriate footballers in Spain
Bosnia and Herzegovina expatriate sportspeople in Spain
Expatriate footballers in Croatia
Bosnia and Herzegovina expatriate sportspeople in Croatia
Expatriate footballers in Ukraine
Bosnia and Herzegovina expatriate sportspeople in Ukraine